The Barlings Chronicle is an important late 13th or early 14th century Latin chronicle from the Premonstratensian Barlings Abbey in Lincolnshire, England. It is closely related to the Hagnaby Chronicle.

References

English chronicles
13th century in England
14th century in England
History of Lincolnshire
13th-century Latin books
14th-century Latin books